NSW Bookstall Company was a Sydney company which operated a chain of newsagencies throughout New South Wales. It was notable as a publisher of inexpensive paperback books which were written, illustrated, published and printed in Australia, and sold to commuters at bookstalls in railway stations and elsewhere in New South Wales.

History
The company was founded as the Sydney Bookstall Company by Henry Lloyd (ca.1847 – 24 September 1897) of "Linden Hall", Annandale, New South Wales around 1880 as a newsagent. Its first foray into publishing may have been racebooks (form guides or programmes) for the Hawkesbury Race Club around 1886.

A. C. Rowlandson (15 June 1865 – 15 June 1922) joined as a tram ticket seller in 1883 and built a strong interest in the business, which he bought from Henry Lloyd's widow. The greatest part of the company's business consisted of retailing local, interstate and overseas periodicals, postcards (Neville Cayley produced a series) and stationery from its eight city shops and fifty-odd railway stall outlets, but was important as one of Australia's most successful book publishers and retailers of locally produced paperback books.

Considerable effort was put into the artwork of the paperbacks, both on their brightly colored covers and the  illustrations within. Artists who contributed included J. Muir Auld, Percy Benison, L. H. Booth, Norman Carter, H. W. Cotton, John P. Davis, Ambrose Dyson, Will Dyson, Tom Ferry, A. J. Fisher, Harry Garlick, C. H. Hunt, Ben Jordan, Harry Julius, George W. Lambert, Fred Leist, Norman Lindsay, Lionel Lindsay Percy Lindsay, Ruby Lindsay, Vernon Lorimer, David Low,  Hugh Maclean, Frank P. Mahony, Claude Marquet, R. H. Moppett, Charles Nuttall, G. C. Pearce, James Postlethwaite, L. L. Roush, James F. Scott, Sydney Ure Smith, D. H. Souter, Percy Spence, Martin Stainforth, Alf Vincent and Harry J. Weston.

On Rowlandson's death, Reg. Wynn (ca.1866 – 17 December 1925) took over as managing director, and W. A. Crew was circulation manager. The company erected a large building at the corner of Market Street and Castlereagh Street.
Reg. Wynn was succeeded by Paul Dowling.

With the onset of World War II, imports of comic books was severely restricted, which opened the market, previously swamped by the U.S. and British houses, to anyone who could provide a quality product, and NSW Bookstall was ideally placed to publish and distribute such work. Tony Rafty, Will Donald, Tom Hubble, Noel Cook and Terry Powis were among the more successful artists, and the partnership of Brodie Mack and writer Peter Amos (real name Archie E. Martin) produced some excellent work for NSW Bookstall. By 1949, the opportunity provided by wartime shortages no longer applied, and Australia was once again flooded with excess overseas production.

Titles
This list of titles of the range of NSW Bookstall titles, which is commonly referred as The Bookstall Series, is representative but not exhaustive.
J. H. M. Abbott: Ensign Calder;
Sally: The Tale of a Currency Lass;
The Sign of the Serpent
Arthur H. Adams: Double-Bed Dialogues;
The Knight of the Motor Launch;
The New Chum & four other stories
Malcolm Afford: Owl of Darkness
F. Agar: Eros! Eros Wins! 
Bob Allen: The Mare with the Silver Hoof
Gerald R. Baldwin: In Racing Silk;
Lydia's Lovers
Vera Barker: Equality Road;
When Satan Laughs
J. A. Barry: The Luck of the Native Born;
South Seas Shipmates;
Steve Brown's Bunyip
A. Bathgate: Sodger Sandy's Bairn
Louis Becke: The Adventures of Louis Bleke;
Bully Hayes, Buccaneer
Randolph Bedford: Aladdin and the Boss Cockie;
Billy Pagan, Mining Engineer;
Silver Star
George W. Bell: The Little Giants of the East
Francis E. Birtles (illus. by author): Lonely Lands
H. K. Bloxham: The Double Abduction;
On the Fringe of the Never Never
Lancelot Booth: The Devil's Nightcap;
Tools of Satan
E. J. Brady: Tom Pagdin, Pirate
Hilda M. Bridges: The Squatters' Daughter;
The Lady of the Cavern
Roy Bridges: The Barb of an Arrow;
By His Excellency's Command;
By Mountain Tracks;
Cards of Fortune;
The Fenceless Ranges;
Haunts of Fear;
On His Majesty's Service;
Mr. Barrington;
Mystery of the Cliff;
The Stony Heights
John X. Cameron: The Spell of the Bush 
R. J. Cassidy: Chandler of Corralinga
Charles Chauvel: Uncivilised
E. F. Christie: The Calling Voice 
George Cockerill: The Convict Pugilist
Dale Collins: Stolen or Strayed;
Arthur Crocker: The Dingo Pup;
The Great Turos Mystery;
South Sea Sinners
George Darrell: The Belle of the Bush
Aiden de Bruno: The Carson Loan Mystery
Don Delaney: The Captain of the Gang;
For Turon Gold;
Gentleman Jack;
A Rebel of the Bush;
The White Champion
Will Donald: Heel Hitler
Con Drew: The Doings of Dave;
Jinker;
Rogues and Ruses
Edward Dyson: Benno and Some of the Push;
Fact'ry 'Ands;
The Grey Goose Comedy Co.;
In the Roaring Fifties
Loves of Lancelot;
The Missing Link;
Spats' Factory;
Tommy the Hawker and Snifter his Boy
A. R. Falk: Puppets of Chance;
Red Star
J. D. Fitzgerald: Children of the Sunlight
Mabel Forrest: A Bachelor's Wife
The Poems of Adam Lindsay Gordon
Beatrice Grimshaw: The Coral Queen;
White Savage Simon;
Queen Vaiti
Kate Harriott: Invalid and Convalescent Cookery
W. G. Henderson: The Bathers
Bert James: The Loser Pays;
The Mystery of the Boxing Contest
A. E. Jobson: The Adventures of Russell Howard
Cecil Ross Johnston: The Trader
Robert Kaleski: Australian Barkers and Biters
A. R. Kent: A Chinese Vengeance
Norman Lindsay: A Curate in Bohemia;
Norman Lindsay's Book
Sumner Locke: Brownie Unlimited;
The Dawsons' Uncle George;
Mum Dawson — Boss;
Skeeter Farm
H. R. McDuffie: Rooks and Crooks
Claude McKay and Harry Julius Theatrical Caricatures
John D. Fitzgerald: Greater Sydney and Greater Newcastle
Jack McLaren: Feathers of Heaven;
Fringe of the Law;
The Oil Seekers;
Fagaloa's Daughter;
Red Mountain;
The Savagery of Margaret Nestor;
The Skipper of The Roaring Meg;
Spear-Eye;
Sunlight, Adventure and Love;
Talifa
A. Ian Macleod: Hack's Brat
A. E. Martin: The Romance of Nomenclature, (1943) containing 1,250 Place Names in South Australia, West Australia and the Northern Territory
Clarence W. Martin: Ubique
Harold Mercer: Amazon Island
Edward Meryon: At Hollands' Tank;
One False Step;
Yellow Silver
William Monckton: Three Years with Thunderbolt
Jack North: The Black Opal;
Harry Dale's Grand National;
A Son of the Bush
Ernest O'Ferrall: Bolger and the Boarders
Ernest Osborne: The Copra Trader;
Creatures of Impulse;
The Plantation Manager
Harrison Owen: The Mount Marunga Mystery
Vance Palmer: The Boss of Killara;
The Shantykeeper's Daughter
Sydney Partrige: Rocky Section
Sydney Partrige and Cecil Raworth: The Mystery of Wall's Hill
S. W. Powell: The Closed Lagoon;
A Golden Chance;
The Great Jude Seal;
Hermit Island;
The Maker of Pearls;
A Mantle of Authority; 
The Pearls of Cheong Tah;
The Trader of Kameko;
X-Mixture
Ambrose Pratt: Dan Kelly – Outlaw;
The Golden Kangaroo;
The Outlaws of Weddin Range;
Three Years with Thunderbolt;
Wolaroi's Cup
Clement Pratt: Caloola
"Rata" (Thomas Richard Roydhouse): The Coloured Conquest
Broda Reynolds: Dawn Asper;
The Heart of the Bush;
The Selector Girl
Charles Rodda: Cerise and Gold;
The Fortunes of Geoffrey Mayne
Ivan Archer Rosenblum: Marjorie of Blue Lake;
Stella Sothern
Steele Rudd: Back at Our Selection;
The Book of Dan;
Dad in Politics; 
The Dashwoods;
Duncan McClure; 
For Life; 
Grandpa's Selection;
Kayton's Selection;
Memoirs of Corporal Keeley;
On an Australian Farm;
On Our Selection;
Our New Selection;
The Old Homestead;
The Poor Parson;
Sandy's Selection; 
From Selection to City;
Stocking Our Selection
W. Sabelburg: The Key of the Mystery
John Sandes: Love and the Aeroplane
Charles E. Sayers: The Jumping Double
H. M. Somer: Base Brands
Edward S. Sorenson: Murty Brown;
Mystery of Murrawang;
The Rheas of Werriwang; 
The Squatter's Ward
Thomas E. Spencer: Bindawalla;
Budgeree Ballads;
The Haunted Shanty;
How McDougall Topped the Score, and other Verses and Sketches;
The Spring Cleaning; 
The Surprising Adventures of Bridget McSweeney
That Droll Lady;
Why Doherty Died
A. G. Stephens (ed.) Aboriginalities (from The Bulletin)
Bill's Idées;
The Bulletin Book of Humorous Verses and Recitations
The Bulletin Reciter;
Gum Blossoms: A Volume of Australian Verse 
Crystal Stirling: Soldiers Two
Ralph Stock: The Pyjama Man;
The Recipe for Rubber
R. S. Tait: Scotty Mac, Shearer
Taylor: Campaign Cartoons
Harry Tighe: The Man of Sympathy
Robert Waldron: The Flying Doctor;
Pearl Shell
J. M. Walsh: Goldie Law;
Tap Tap Island 
Charles D. Websdale (J. Muir Auld ill.): Seafarers
Charles White: Ben Hall;
Captain Moonlite;
Gardiner, King of the Road;
John Vane, Bushranger;
The Kelly Gang;
Martin Cash;
Short-lived Bushrangers
Arthur Wright: The Boss o' Yedden;
The Boy from Bullarah;
The Breed Holds Good;
A Close Call;
A Colt from the Country;
Fettered by Fate;
Gambler's Gold;
A Game of Chance;
A Good Recovery;
The Hate of a Hun;
In the Last Stride;
Keane of Kalgoorlie;
A Rogue's Luck;
A Rough Passage;
The Outlaw's Daughter;
Over the Odds;
Rung In;
A Sport from Hollowlog Flat;
The Squatter's Secret;
Under a Cloud;
When Nuggets Glistened;
Claude P. Wynn: Princess Naldi's Fetish
(none named): Australian Bungalow and Cottage Home Designs
(none named): Canberra Cookery Book
(none named): Guide to the City of Sydney and the Pleasure Resorts of New South Wales
(none named): The Harbour Guide
(none named): Panoramic Sydney
(none named): Sydney from the Air

References

Further reading 
 Carol Mills, The New South Wales Bookstall Company as a Publisher, Canberra: Mulini Press, 1991.
 Carol Mills,  An Australian "Dime Novel" Publisher, Clayton, Victoria: Bibliographical Society of Australia and New Zealand, 1992.
 Carol Mills, "The Bookstall novel: an Australian paperback revolution 1904-1946", in: Australian Cultural History, no. 11, 1992, pp. 87–99. In special issue: Books, Readers, Reading based on a conference at the University of New South Wales, June 1991.
 Martyn Lyons and John Arnold, eds., A History of the Book in Australia, 1891-1945, Brisbane: Queensland University Press, 2001.

External links
 The New South Wales Bookstall Company, Sensational Tales: Australian Popular Publishing 1850s-1990s (exhibition), University of Melbourne

Companies based in Sydney
Book publishing companies of Australia
Defunct publishing companies
Series of books
Australian literature